Catriona Sandilands is a Canadian writer and scholar in the environmental humanities. She is most well known for her conception of queer ecology. She is currently a Professor in the Faculty of Environmental Studies at York University. She was a Canada Research Chair in Sustainability and Culture between 2004 and 2014. She was a Fellow of the Pierre Elliott Trudeau Foundation in 2016.
Sandilands served as president of the Association for the Study of Literature and Environment in 2015. She is also a past President of the Association for Literature, Environment, and Culture in Canada (ALECC) and the American Society for Literature and the Environment.

Education 
Sandilands received a BA in sociology from the University of Victoria and subsequently an MA and PhD in sociology from York University.

Research 
Sandilands' first book, The Good-Natured Feminist: Ecofeminism and the Quest for Democracy was published in 1999 by University of Minnesota Press. It explores identity, gender and democracy through the lens of ecofeminism and the perceived relationships between the category of "women" and nature. Sandilands invokes a multitude of contemporary feminist and political theorizations of democracy, including Donna Haraway's cyborg feminism. The Good-Natured Feminist was described as "a strikingly original and vitally important contribution to debates in feminist theory, environmental thought, and cultural studies ...... an essential text not only for those engaged in ecofeminist projects, but, more broadly, for anyone interested in feminism, environmentalism, or social and political theory." In 2004, Sandilands co-edited the multidisciplinary anthology This Elusive Land: Women and the Canadian Environment with Melody Hessing and Rebecca Raglon.

Her most well-known work to date, Queer Ecologies: Sex, Nature, Politics, Desire, co-edited with Bruce Erickson, was "the first book-length volume to establish the intersections of queer theory and environmentalisms at such depth .... [and] created a rich field for further research." It "advances her earlier work on ecofeminism, democracy and sexuality", and explores "such issues as animal sex, species politics, environmental justice, lesbian space and "gay" ghettos, AIDS literatures, and queer nationalities".

Sandilands has also written extensively on environment, society, culture and literature in publications such as The Guardian and the Los Angeles Review of Books.

Selected publications 
"This Land Has Called Forth from You Your Strength as a Lesbian": A Separatist Ecology? (Toronto: Institute for Women's Studies and Gender Studies, University of Toronto, Research Monograph #5). 50 pp. (2002)
The Good-Natured Feminist: Ecofeminism and the Quest for Democracy (Minneapolis: University of Minnesota Press). 245 pp. (1999)

References

External links 
 Personal Website
 York University Faculty Page

Academic staff of York University
York University alumni
University of Victoria alumni
21st-century Canadian non-fiction writers
Canadian women non-fiction writers
Canadian women academics
Canadian LGBT writers
Canada Research Chairs
Environmental studies scholars
Living people
21st-century Canadian women writers
Year of birth missing (living people)
21st-century Canadian LGBT people
Canadian LGBT academics